The Hashemites, also House of Hashim, are the royal family of Jordan, which they have ruled since 1921, and were the royal family of the kingdoms of Hejaz (1916–1925), Syria (1920), and Iraq (1921–1958). The family had ruled the city of Mecca continuously from the 10th century, frequently as vassals of outside powers, and were given the thrones of the Hejaz, Syria, Iraq, and Jordan following their World War I alliance with the British Empire; this arrangement became known as the "Sharifian solution".

The family belongs to the Dhawu Awn, one of the branches of the Ḥasanid Sharifs of Mecca, also referred to as Hashemites. Their eponymous ancestor is traditionally considered to be Hashim ibn Abd Manaf, great-grandfather of the Islamic prophet Muhammad. The Ḥasanid Sharifs of Mecca (from whom the Hashemite royal family is directly descended), including the Hashemites' ancestor Qatadah ibn Idris, were Zaydī Shīʿas until the late Mamluk or early Ottoman period, when they became followers of the Shāfiʿī school of Sunnī Islam.

The current dynasty was founded by Sharif Hussein ibn Ali, who was appointed as Sharif and Emir of Mecca by the Ottoman sultan Abdul Hamid II in 1908, then in 1916—after concluding a secret agreement with the British Empire—was proclaimed King of Arab countries (but only recognized as King of the Hejaz) after initiating the Arab Revolt against the Ottoman Empire. His sons Abdullah and Faisal assumed the thrones of Jordan and Iraq in 1921, and his first son Ali succeeded him in the Hejaz in 1924. Abdullah was assassinated in 1951, but his descendants continue to rule Jordan today. The other two branches of the dynasty did not survive; Ali was ousted by Ibn Saud after the British withdrew their support from Hussein in 1924–1925, and Faisal's grandson Faisal II was executed in the 1958 Iraqi coup d'état.

History

Rulers of Mecca
According to historians Ibn Khaldun and Ibn Hazm, in  968 Ja'far ibn Muhammad al-Hasani came from Medina and conquered Mecca in the name of the Fatimid caliph al-Mu'izz after the latter had conquered Egypt from the Ikhshidids. Jafar was from the wider Banu Hashim clan, albeit a different branch to the modern dynasty. The Banu Hashim claim to trace their ancestry from Hāshim ibn ʿAbd Manāf (died c. 497 CE), the great-grandfather of the Islamic prophet Muhammad, although the definition today mainly refers to the descendants of Muhammad's daughter Fāṭimah. 

Control of Mecca remained with the clan; when the Ottoman Turks took control of Egypt in 1517, Sharif Barakat quickly recognized the change in sovereignty, sending his son Abu Numayy II to the Ottoman sultan Selim I in Cairo, bearing the keys to the holy cities and other gifts. The Ottoman sultan confirmed Barakat and Abu Numayy in their positions as co-rulers of the Hejaz.

World War I and the Arab Revolt 

Before World War I, Hussein bin Ali of the Hashemite Dhawu-'Awn clan ruled the Hejaz on behalf of the Ottoman sultan. For some time it had been the practice of the Sublime Porte to appoint the Emir of Mecca from among a select group of candidates. In 1908, Hussein bin Ali was appointed to the Sharifate of Mecca. He found himself increasingly at odds with the Young Turks in control at Istanbul, while he strove to secure his family's position as hereditary emirs. Hussein bin Ali's lineage and destined position as the Sharif of Mecca helped foster the ambition for an independent Arab kingdom and caliphate. These pretensions came to the Ottoman rulers' attention and caused them to "invite" Hussein to Istanbul as the guest of the sultan in order to keep him under direct supervision. Hussein brought his four sons, Ali, Abdullah, Faisal, and Zeid, with him. It was not until after the Young Turk Revolution that he was able to return to the Hijaz and was officially appointed the Sharif.

Of Hussein's four sons, Abdullah was the most politically ambitious and became the planner and driving force behind the Arab revolt. Abdullah received military training in both the Hijaz and Istanbul. He was the deputy for Mecca in the Ottoman Parliament between 1912 and 1914. During this period, Abdullah developed deep interest in Arab nationalism and linked his father's interest for autonomous rule in the Hijaz to complete Arab emancipation. In 1914 he met the British high commissioner, Lord Kitchener, in Cairo to discuss the possibility of the British supporting an Arab uprising against the Turks. The possibility of co-operation was raised but no commitment was made by either side. Shortly after Abdullah returned to Mecca, he became his father's foreign minister, political advisor, and one of the commanders of the Arab Revolt.

Faisal, Hussein's third son, played an active role in the revolt as commander of the Arab army while the overall leadership was placed in the hands of his father. The idea of an Arab uprising against the Ottoman Empire was first conceived by Abdullah. Only after gradual and persistent nudging did Abdullah convince his father, the conservative Sharif of Mecca, to move from the idea of home rule of a portion of Arabia within the Ottoman Empire to complete and total independence of the entire Empire's Arab provinces. Hussein recognized the necessity of breaking away from the Empire in the beginning of 1914 when he realized that he would not be able to complete his political objectives within the framework of the Ottomans. To have any success with the Arab revolt, the backing of another great power was crucial.

Hussein regarded Arab unity as synonymous with his own kingship, he aspired to have the entire Arab peninsula, Greater Syria, and Iraq under his, and his descendants', rule. After a year of fruitless negotiation, Sir Henry McMahon conveyed the British government's agreement to recognize Arab independence over an area that was much more limited than that to which Hussein had aspired. The Arab revolt, an Anglo-Hashemite plot in its essence, broke out in June 1916. Britain financed the revolt and supplied arms, provisions, direct artillery support, and experts in desert warfare including the soon to be famous T. E. Lawrence. The Hashemites promised more than they were able to deliver, and their ambitious plan collapsed. There were only a small number of Syrian and Iraqi nationalists who joined under the Sharifan banner while others remained loyal to the Ottoman sultan.

Sharif Hussein bin Ali rebelled against the rule of the Ottomans during the Arab Revolt of 1916. For Hashemite contribution to the Allied forces effort to bring down the Ottoman Empire, Britain promised its support for Arab independence. However, the McMahon–Hussein correspondence left territorial limits governing this promise obscurely defined leading to a long and bitter disagreement between the two sides.

Post-War: the Sharifian Solution

After the war, the British devised a "Sharifian Solution" to "[make] straight all the tangle" of their various wartime commitments. This proposed that three sons of Sharif Hussein would be installed as kings of newly created countries across the Middle East.

Given the need to rein in expenditure and factors outside British control, including France's removing of Faisal from Syria in July 1920, and Abdullah's entry into Transjordan (which had been the southern part of Faisal's Syria) in November 1920, the eventual Sharifian solution was somewhat different, the informal name for a British policy put into effect by Secretary of State for the Colonies Winston Churchill following the 1921 Cairo conference.

Hussein bin Ali had five sons:

 Ali, who briefly succeeded to the throne of Hejaz before its loss to the Saud family in 1925.
 Abdullah, became the amir of Transjordan in 1921 and king of Jordan in 1946, and whose descendants continue to rule the kingdom known ever since as the Hashemite Kingdom of Jordan.
 Faisal, briefly proclaimed King of the Arab Kingdom of Syria in 1920, became King of Iraq in 1921.
 Prince Zeid bin Hussein, who moved to Jordan when his brother's grandson, King Faisal II of Iraq, was overthrown and murdered in a coup in 1958.
 Hassan, died at a young age.

Hussein bin Ali continued to rule an independent Hejaz, of which he proclaimed himself king, between 1916 and 1924, after the collapse of Ottoman power, with the tacit support of the British Foreign Office. His supporters are sometimes referred to as "Sharifians" or the "Sharifian party". Hussein bin Ali's chief rival in the Arabian Peninsula, the king of the Najd (highlands), Ibn Saud, annexed the Hejaz in 1925 and established his own son, Faysal bin Abdulaziz Al Saud, as governor. The region was later incorporated into Saudi Arabia.

In Transjordan, the British government granted its independence in 1921 with Abdullah as ruler. The degree of independence that was afforded to the Arab states by colonial powers was an ongoing issue at the time, however in the case of Transjordan, the independence enjoyed was limited; with substantial influence and control reserved by British government in London. In domestic affairs the local ruler was given a considerable amount of power nonetheless; but these powers were exercised in an autocratic manner by the Hashemite family while remaining under the superintendence of the British Resident in Amman, as well as the British high commissioner in Jerusalem. Abdullah was assassinated in 1951, but his descendants continue to rule Jordan today. 

In Iraq, the Hashemites ruled for almost four decades, until Faisal's grandson Faisal II was executed in the 1958 Iraqi coup d'état.

Members and family tree

Ancestry
Sources:

Jordanian main branch 
The King and Queen (The monarch and his wife)
The Crown Prince (The King's elder son)
Princess Iman (The King's elder daughter)
Princess Salma (The King's younger daughter)
Prince Hashem (The King's younger son)

Descendants of King Hussein of Jordan 

Queen Noor (King Hussein's fourth wife and widow)
Hamzah and Princess Basmah (The King's half-brother and half-sister-in-law)
Princess Haya (The King's half-niece)
Princess Zein (The King's half-niece)
Princess Noor (The King's half-niece)
Princess Badiya (The King's half-niece)
Prince Hussein (The King's half-nephew)
Prince Muhammad (The King's half-nephew)
Prince Hashim and Princess Fahdah (The King's half-brother and half-sister-in-law)
Princess Haalah (The King's half-niece)
Princess Rayet (The King's half-niece)
Princess Fatima (The King's half-niece)
Prince Hussein (The King's half-nephew)
Prince Mohammad (The King's half-nephew)
Princess Iman (The King's half-sister)
Princess Raiyah (The King's half-sister)
Princess Haya (The King's half-sister)
Prince Ali and Princess Rym (The King's half-brother and half-sister-in-law)
Princess Jalila (The King's half-niece)
Prince Abdullah (The King's half-nephew)
Princess Muna (King Hussein's second wife; The King's mother)
Prince Faisal and Princess Zeina (The King's brother and sister-in-law)
Princess Ayah (The King's niece)
Prince Omar (The King's nephew)
Princess Sara (The King's niece)
Princess Aisha (The King's niece)
Prince Abdullah (The King's nephew)
Prince Muhammad (The King's nephew)
Princess Rajaa (The King’s niece)
Princess Alia (The King's former sister-in-law)
Princess Aisha (The King's sister)
Princess Zein (The King's sister)
Princess Alia (The King's half-sister)

Descendants of King Talal of Jordan 

 Princess Taghrid (The King's aunt)
Prince Talal and Princess Ghida (The King's cousin and cousin-in-law)
Prince Hussein (The King's first cousin once removed)
Prince Muhammad (The King's first cousin once removed)
Princess Rajaa (The King's first cousin once removed)
Prince Ghazi and Princess Miriam (The King's cousin and cousin-in-law)
Princess Tasneem (The King's first cousin once removed)
Prince Abdullah (The King's first cousin once removed)
Princess Jennah (The King's first cousin once removed)
Princess Salsabil (The King's first cousin once removed)
Princess Firyal (The King's former aunt)
Prince Hassan and Princess Sarvath (The King's uncle and aunt)
Princess Rahma (The King's cousin)
Princess Sumaya (The King's cousin)
Princess Badiya (The King's cousin)
Prince Rashid and Princess Zeina (The King's cousin and cousin-in-law)
Prince Hassan (The King's first cousin once removed)
Prince Talal (The King's first cousin once removed)
Princess Basma (The King's aunt)

Descendants of King Abdullah I of Jordan 

Prince Ali and Princess Reema (The King's cousin and cousin-in-law)
Prince Muhammad and Princess Sima (The King's second cousin and his wife)
Prince Hamzah (The King's second cousin)
Princess Rania (The King's second cousin)
Princess Karma (The King's second cousin)
Prince Haidar (The King's second cousin)
Princess Na'afa (The King's second cousin)
Princess Rajwa (The King's second cousin)
Princess Basma Fatima (The King's second cousin)
Prince Asem and Princess Sana (The King's cousin and cousin-in-law)
Princess Yasmine (The King's second cousin)
Princess Sara (The King's second cousin)
Princess Noor (The King's second cousin)
Princess Salha (The King's second cousin)
Princess Nejla (The King's second cousin)
Prince Nayef and Princess Farah (The King's second cousin and his wife)
Princess Naifeh (The King's grandaunt)

Iraqi Hashemites (Descendants of Prince Ra'ad ibn Zaid) 

The descendants of Iraqi Hashemite prince Ra'ad ibn Zaid have been awarded Jordanian citizenship and are addressed in the style of His Royal Highness and Prince in Jordan. Descendants include Prince Zeid bin Ra'ad, a Jordanian diplomat, who served as United Nations High Commissioner for Human Rights from 2014 to 2018, and Prince Mired bin Ra'ad.

Non-royals 
A number of Dhawu Awn clansmen migrated with Emir Abdullah I to Transjordan in the early 1920s. Several of their descendants have gained prominent positions in the Jordanian state, including the positions of Chief of the Royal Court, Prime Minister, and Ambassador. Descendants of the Dhawu Awn clansmen are referred to as Sharifs and, other than Zaid ibn Shaker, have not been awarded princely title. Examples include former Prime Ministers and Royal Court Chiefs Sharif Hussein ibn Nasser, Sharif Abdelhamid Sharaf, Queen Zein Al-Sharaf (wife of King Talal and mother of King Hussein) and her brother Sharif Nasser ibn Jamil.

Princely title in Jordan is typically restricted only to patrilineal descendants of any of the four sons of Hussein bin Ali, Sharif of Mecca. 

Sharif Ali bin al-Hussein is currently the leader of the Iraqi Constitutional Monarchy political party and currently uses the title "Sharif".

Descendants of Prince Zaid ibn Shaker 

Prince Zaid ibn Shaker, former PM and Commander-in-chief of the Jordanian military, was a member of the Dhawu Awn clan whose father Shaker ibn Zaid migrated to Transjordan with his cousin Abdullah I of Jordan. He was awarded the non-hereditary title of "prince" in 1996. His children, one son and one daughter, are addressed as "Sharifs" – not princes.

See also 
 Hashemite custodianship of Jerusalem holy sites
 Royal and Hashemite Order of the Pearl (Sulu, Philippines)
 Succession to the Jordanian throne

Citations

General bibliography

External links 
 

 
20th century in Iraq
Arab dynasties
Hasanid dynasties
History of Saudi Arabia
Middle Eastern royal families
Modern history of Jordan